Alexandru Ionuț Popescu (born 6 January 1998) is a professional Romanian footballer who plays as a forward for CSM Deva.

References

External links 
 
 

1998 births
Living people
Romanian footballers
Association football forwards
Liga I players
Liga II players
Liga III players
CS Universitatea Craiova players
LPS HD Clinceni players
CS Mioveni players
ACS Viitorul Târgu Jiu players
SSU Politehnica Timișoara players
CS Aerostar Bacău players
FC Dunărea Călărași players
CSM Deva players